The enzyme galactolipase (EC 3.1.1.26) catalyzes the reaction

1,2-diacyl-3-β-D-galactosyl-sn-glycerol + 2 H2O  3-β-D-galactosyl-sn-glycerol + 2 carboxylates

This enzyme belongs to the family of hydrolases, specifically those acting on carboxylic ester bonds.  The systematic name of this enzyme class is 1,2-diacyl-3-β-D-galactosyl-sn-glycerol acylhydrolase. Other names in common use include galactolipid lipase, polygalactolipase, and galactolipid acylhydrolase.  This enzyme participates in glycerolipid metabolism.

References

 
 

EC 3.1.1
Enzymes of unknown structure